Ponte Garibaldi is a bridge that links Lungotevere De' Cenci to Piazza Giuseppe Gioachino Belli in Rome (Italy), in the Rioni Regola and Trastevere.

Description 
The bridge was designed by architect Angelo Vescovali and built between 1884 and 1888; it was dedicated to Giuseppe Garibaldi, "Hero of Two Worlds" and one of the fathers of Italian unification. The bridge, enlarged in 1959, was released to facilitate the expansion of the town towards Trastevere.

Transports 
The bridge is crossed by tram 8 and buses H, 780 e 781.

Notes

Bibliography 

Bridges in Rome
Bridges completed in 1888
Road bridges in Italy
Rome R. XIII Trastevere